is a Japanese footballer who plays in the Tohoku Soccer League for Cobaltore Onagawa.

Career statistics

Club
Updated to the start of the 2023 season.

References

External links

Profile at ReinMeer Aomori
Profile at Cobaltore Onagawa
j-league

1985 births
Living people
Tohoku Gakuin University alumni
Association football people from Miyagi Prefecture
Japanese footballers
J1 League players
J2 League players
J3 League players
Japan Football League players
JEF United Chiba players
Gainare Tottori players
ReinMeer Aomori players
Cobaltore Onagawa players
Association football midfielders